Chan Canasta (born Chananel Mifelew, 9 January 1920 – 22 April 1999) was a pioneer of mental magic in the 1950s and 1960s, becoming the first TV celebrity magician in the 1950s, and then in later life he turned to painting. Born in Kraków, Poland, he was the son of a Polish-Jewish educator.

Personal life
Chan Canasta was born Chananel Mifelw in Poland in 1920s. Mifelew's father was an emigre from Russia. Mifelew attended Krakow University where he studied philosophy and natural sciences for his first year. However, he then left Poland and went to  Jerusalem to study psychology. His studies were interrupted by the outbreak of the Second World War, and he volunteered to join the Royal Air Force. He fought in the Western Desert, North Africa, Greece and Italy, and eventually took up British citizenship.

He was twice married and died in London at the age of 79.

Magic career

Stage career
Canasta moved to Great Britain in 1947, following a stint in the Royal Air Force. Starting as a card magician who took his surname from the popular card game of canasta, he became a well-known stage magician performing feats of memory and book tests during the late 1940s. Over the course of his career, Canasta performed at the London Palladium, the Desert Inn in Las Vegas, and at the Playboy Club circuit.

Canasta didn't refer to himself as a magician or a mentalist; he often used his own term "psycho-magician" but was most commonly billed as "A Remarkable Man".

Television
In 1951 Canasta recorded his first television show for the BBC - a sparse affair with only a few props that concentrated on mental effects. He became TV's first celebrity magician in the 1950s, and broadcast his last show in March 1960. Throughout his career, he made more than 350 television appearances, including on the Ed Sullivan, Arlene Francis and Jack Paar shows.

His final BBC TV appearance was in 1971, on Parkinson, for he had left television performing behind several years earlier, although he did reappear on Israeli TV on 11 November 1983.

Technique
Canasta called his effects "experiments" rather than tricks. He performed experiments in thought using two packs of playing cards. He would ask a spectator to think of a card then another to pick the unstated thought-of-card from a different pack; or he would place cards onto a table and ask a spectator to pick up one card that another spectator was only thinking of. The effects were risky and he would often fail on live television. Contemporary magicians decried Canasta's approach but this element of "risk-taking" has been a major influence on the current generation of magicians.

Canasta's signature routine was his "Experiment With Books". He would invite a volunteer from the audience to choose a random page, then would predict precisely the number of words comprising three syllables it contained. He was not concerned if he made the odd mistake when performing this trick, believing a few errors along the way simply highlighted the validity of his normally correct answers.

Legacy
Among magicians, Canasta is recognised for inventing the principle that eschewed perfection, believing that making an occasional error made his other effects stronger and more entertaining, an approach later followed by comedy magician, Tommy Cooper.  British mentalist Derren Brown has cited Canasta as a prime influence, stating, "he was a real inspiration".

Art career
Canasta retired from the stage at the height of his fame to pursue a dream to become a painter. In his later years he established a second career as an artist, signing his work not as Canasta, but as Mifelew, and had successful gallery shows in London and New York.

References

Further reading
David Britland (2000) Chan Canasta: A Remarkable Man Volume 1
David Britland (2001) Chan Canasta: A Remarkable Man Volume 2
Chan Canasta (1966) Chan Canasta's Book of Oopses : Being a Collection of Thrilling Experiments in Which the Book Itself Plays the Part of the Mind-Reader; George G. Harrap & Co., Ltd.

External links

 

1920 births
1999 deaths
People from Kraków
British magicians
Mentalists
Polish emigrants to the United Kingdom
Royal Air Force personnel of World War II
People with acquired British citizenship